Souvanny Souksavath (born 1 September 1960) is a Laotian sports shooter. He competed in the mixed 50 metre free pistol event at the 1980 Summer Olympics.

References

External links
 

1960 births
Living people
Laotian male sport shooters
Olympic shooters of Laos
Shooters at the 1980 Summer Olympics
Place of birth missing (living people)